The Extraordinary and Plenipotentiary Ambassador of Peru to the Kingdom of Sweden is the official representative of the Republic of Peru to the Kingdom of Sweden.

The ambassador in Stockholm is also accredited to neighbouring Denmark and has also been accredited to Iceland and Norway, as well as Finland.

Both countries established diplomatic relations on February 11, 1938 and maintain embasssies in both Stockholm and Lima. The former was closed in 2010 but reopened in 2012, and the latter was also closed in 2001 but reopened in 2015.

List of representatives

See also
List of ambassadors of Peru to Denmark
List of ambassadors of Peru to Finland
List of ambassadors of Peru to Norway

Notes

References

Sweden
Peru